Carphephorus pseudoliatris, the bristleleaf chaffhead , is a species of North American plants in the family Asteraceae. They are native to the southeastern United States in the states of Florida, Georgia, Alabama, Mississippi, and Louisiana.

Carphephorus pseudoliatris is an herb up to 100 cm (40 inches) tall. It produces a flat-topped inflorescence with many small purplish flower heads containing disc florets but no ray florets.

References

External links
Native Florida Wildflowers
Southeastern Flora
Plants of Southern Alabama and adjoining areas of Mississippi and Florida

Eupatorieae
Plants described in 1816
Flora of the Southeastern United States
Flora without expected TNC conservation status